Kateřina Bartoňová (born 17 January 1990) is a Czech professional basketball player. She plays for Czech Republic women's national basketball team. She competed in the 2012 Summer Olympics.

References

Living people
Czech women's basketball players
1990 births
Olympic basketball players of the Czech Republic
Basketball players at the 2012 Summer Olympics
Olympiacos Women's Basketball players
Point guards
Shooting guards
Czech expatriate basketball people in Spain
Czech expatriate basketball people in Greece
Sportspeople from Pardubice